Sardar Muhammad Asif Nakai is a Pakistani politician who was Provincial Minister of Punjab for Communication and Works, in office from 27 August 2018 till April 2022. He had been a member of the Provincial Assembly of the Punjab from August 2018 till January 2023.

Previously he was a Member of the Provincial Assembly of the Punjab from 2008 to 2018 and a member of the National Assembly of Pakistan from 2002 to 2007.

Early life and education
He was born on 28 August 1960 in Kasur. He is direct descendent of Heera Singh Sandhu founder of the Nakai Misl; hence is also related to Maharani Datar Kaur, wife of Maharaja Ranjit Singh.

He graduated in 1983 form University of the Punjab and has the degree of Bachelor of Arts.

Political career
He contested and won from both NA-140 and NA-141 in 2002. He was elected to the National Assembly of Pakistan as a candidate of Pakistan Muslim League (Q) (PML-Q) from Constituency NA-141 (Kasur-IV) in 2002 Pakistani general election. In September 2004, he was inducted into the federal cabinet and was made Minister of State for Housing and Works.

He was elected to the Provincial Assembly of the Punjab as a candidate of PML-Q from Constituency PP-183 (Kasur-IX) in 2008 Pakistani general election.

He was re-elected to the Provincial Assembly of the Punjab as a candidate of PML-Q from Constituency PP-183 (Kasur-IX) in 2013 Pakistani general election.

He was re-elected to the Provincial Assembly of the Punjab as a candidate of Pakistan Tehreek-e-Insaf (PTI) from Constituency PP-180 (Kasur-VII) in 2018 Pakistani general election.

On 27 August 2018, he was inducted into the provincial Punjab cabinet of Chief Minister Sardar Usman Buzdar and was appointed as Provincial Minister of Punjab for Communication and Works.

References

Living people
1960 births
Punjab MPAs 2013–2018
Punjab MPAs 2008–2013
Pakistan Muslim League (Q) MPAs (Punjab)
Pakistani MNAs 2002–2007
Pakistan Muslim League (Q) MNAs
Pakistan Tehreek-e-Insaf MPAs (Punjab)
Provincial ministers of Punjab